Stéphane Delautrette (born 20 September 1972) is a French politician from the Socialist Party who has represented Haute-Vienne's 2nd constituency in the National Assembly since 2022.

References

See also 
 List of deputies of the 16th National Assembly of France

Living people
1972 births
People from Limoges
21st-century French politicians
Members of Parliament for Haute-Vienne
Deputies of the 16th National Assembly of the French Fifth Republic
Socialist Party (France) politicians